The Yamaha Scorpio Z is a commuter-orientated, standard motorcycle which was released in 2006. The Yamaha Scorpio Z underwent a facelift in 2010 and this version can be identified by the 54D model code. The original, unfacelifted version is still available in some markets and the 54D model shares the same engine, transmission, chassis, wheels, and brakes with the original version. The Yamaha Scorpio Z features a 225 cc single overhead camshaft, four-stroke, air-cooled, single cylinder engine which produces 13.4 kW of power and 17.5 Nm of torque.

The Yamaha Scorpio Z's handling and dynamics have been lauded by many reviewers, testers, and owners; especially when the price point is considered. However, the bike has also been called ugly, perhaps motivating the 2011 facelift. The Yamaha Scorpio Z has a claimed fuel consumption of 3.2 L 100 km−1 (31.2 km L−1).

References

Scorpio Z
Standard motorcycles
Motorcycles introduced in 2006